Narthecium asiaticum is a species of plants traditionally placed in the Liliaceae, but now considered a member of the Nartheciaceae. It is endemic to Japan.

References

Endemic flora of Japan
Nartheciaceae
Plants described in 1867